The Rooftop is a 2013 Taiwanese musical film. It is the second feature film directed by Taiwanese singer/actor Jay Chou. Similar to his first feature film, Secret, Jay played multiple roles in the production of the film, as the main lead, director, script-writer and music composer.

The Rooftop is one of the many scripts that Chou has written since the success of Secret in 2007. Most of the scripts are sequels to Secret. However, Chou and his long-time friend Will Liu decided to work on The Rooftop as a challenge to produce the first Chinese mainstream musical-come-martial arts film. They claimed that The Rooftop is a film that is difficult to be categorized, for it combined the elements of musical extravaganza and actions.

Chou has made good use of his experience from filming The Green Hornet in Hollywood, Initial D in Hong Kong and directing over 60 of his own music videos, to conceptualize The Rooftop with music as its roots, combined with actions, to create a genre never seen before in Asia.

Name 
The film is released in Mainland China as "天台爱情" (literally "The Rooftop Love"), to avoid duplication and confusion with box-office sales with another Chinese film named "天台". However, the film poster and promotional materials remained as "天台“. The film is released in all other countries as "天台" (literally "The Rooftop").

Plot

The story occurs in a fantasy world called Galilee City, that consists of two contrasting communities. One group lives on the Rooftop, where they dance and sing their days away with no worries. While those on the ground are affluent and possess more power.

In a chance encounter, Wax gets to meet his billboard dream-girl, Starling, who is an up-and-coming actress/singer. However, their blossoming love is put into test when both are involved in the fight over power on the ground.

Cast

Supporting Cast
 Kenny Bee as Lao Lee (老李), Starling's debt-ridden father
 Eric Tsang as Po-Ye (波爺), owner of Po-Ye Medical Hall
 Na-Dou as Dou-hua (豆花), Po-Ye's son
 A-Ken as Pa-pa Zhao (爬爬趙), owner of the bowling alley
 Tang Chong Sheng as Gen Pi Cong (跟屁從), owner of the apparel & goldfish stalls at Lovers' Lake Night Market
 A-Lang as A-Lang (阿郎) or named Broccoli, Wax's buddy, resident of the Rooftop
 Devon Song as Egg (蛋花), Wax's buddy, resident of the Rooftop

Cameo (uncredited)
 Zhan Yuhao, at the bowling alley
 Chase Chang, in the recording studio
 Andrew Lau, the Mayor of Galilee City
 Will Liu, Boss Li, nightclub owner 
 Soda Voyu, film director
 Gary Yang, Rango's assistant
 Kevin Lin, reporter
 Huang Yu Xun, peddler at Lovers' Lake Night Market
 Zhu Degang, William's assistant
 Vivi Wang Wan Fei, lady on the road
 David Chiang, older Wax
 Fu Yi Wei, older Starling

Production
The film was shot on location in Taiwan, Beijing and Shanghai.

Achievements
The film was named as New York Asian Film Festival Closing Night Selection.

References

External links 
 

Taiwanese musical comedy films
2013 films
2013 action comedy films
2013 romantic comedy films
2010s musical comedy films
Taiwanese romantic comedy films
Taiwanese martial arts comedy films
Kung fu films
2010s martial arts comedy films
Films set in Taiwan
Films shot in Taiwan
Films shot in Beijing
Films shot in Shanghai
2013 martial arts films
2010s Mandarin-language films